Lakewood Ranch High School in Manatee County, Florida, United States, was opened in 1998 in Bradenton, Florida.  It is named after the master planned community it borders, Lakewood Ranch.

In the 2011–2012 school year, Lakewood Ranch High School was awarded the two highest honors given by the Florida High School Athletic Association. The Mustangs placed first in the Academic Team Champions and the Floyd E. Lay Sunshine Cup, All Sports Award.  Lakewood Ranch was the only public school in the State of Florida to win both awards.

The school was in the news in 2015 when a teacher, Hollis Ann Morantes, was arrested on drug and child neglect charges after methamphetamine was found at her home in reach of her child. Morantes was placed on administrative leave and later resigned.

Notable alumni
Lastings Milledge,  baseball player (MLB and NPB)
 Mike Ohlman, baseball player (MLB)
Gus Schlosser, baseball player (MLB)
Dominique Rodgers-Cromartie, football player (NFL)
Charles Trippy, vlogger and bassist for We The Kings
Austin Reiter, football player (NFL)

References

External links 
greatschools.net
Manatee County School Board

Bradenton, Florida
Educational institutions established in 1998
High schools in Manatee County, Florida
Public high schools in Florida
1998 establishments in Florida